Agricultural education is the teaching of agriculture, natural resources, and land management. At higher levels, agricultural education is primarily undertaken to prepare students for employment in the agricultural sector. Classes taught in an agricultural education curriculum may include horticulture, land management, turf grass management, agricultural science, small animal care, machine and shop classes, health and nutrition, livestock management, and biology.

Agricultural education is common at the primary, secondary (including middle and high school in the United States), tertiary (including vocational schools and universities), and adult levels. Elementary agriculture is often taught in both public and private schools, and can cover such subjects as how plants and animals grow and how soil is farmed and conserved. Vocational agriculture trains people for jobs in such areas as production, marketing, and conservation. College agriculture involves training of people to teach or conduct research in order to advance the fields of agriculture and food science. General education informs the public about food and agriculture.

Disciplines closely tied to agricultural education include agricultural communications, agricultural leadership, and extension education.

In the United States 
The chief sources of agriculture education in the United States are high schools, community colleges, four-year colleges and universities, youth organizations, and the 10x15 program.

History
The rapid growth of agricultural education began during the late 19th century. In 1862, the United States Congress created the Department of Agriculture to gather and distribute agricultural information. The Morrill Act, which provided the land-grant schools, became law that same year. The Hatch Act of 1887 gave federal funds to establish agricultural experiment stations. The first dairy school in the U.S. was created at the University of Wisconsin–Madison in 1891.
 
Government support for agricultural education has increased during the 20th century. For example, the Smith-Lever Act of 1914 created what is now the Cooperative Extension System (1988). The Smith-Hughes Act of 1917 and the George-Barden Act of 1946 financed high-school instruction in farming. Woodlawn High School (Woodlawn, Virginia) was the first public high school in the United States to offer agricultural education classes under the Smith-Hughes Act. The Vocational Education Act of 1963 funded training in other fields of agriculture.
 
Agricultural science and education expanded after 1900 in response to a need for more technical knowledge and skill in the use of newly developed agricultural technologies. This development led to the use of modern farming methods that required fewer farmworkers, resulting in larger, corporatized farms and ranches. This development increased the need for more agriculture science and education.

Other legislation influenced the development of agricultural education into what the field is today. It has developed throughout the last century from various laws and pieces of legislation.

The Education for All Handicapped Children Act of 1975 required all public schools to provide a free and appropriate education to all students with disabilities. Under this provision, children with disabilities were now allowed to enroll in agricultural classes. The Americans with Disabilities Act, enacted in 1990, further required public schools to give students with disabilities equal opportunity for education to all other children in the country, and as a result, it increased opportunities for students with disabilities participate in agricultural classes.

Educate America Act of 1994 raised benchmark standards for public education at the districts level, increasing curriculum and development requirements for all classes, including agricultural ones. The School-to-Work Opportunities Act, also of 1994, required teachers to teach students tasks and disciplines that would help their students prepare for employment once they graduated, of which practical education in agriculture was a major part. Finally, No Child Left Behind (Elementary and Secondary Education Act of 2001) further raised standards for students in public schools and increased requirements of teachers in order to reach these standards, affecting agricultural education as part of the general curriculum of many schools.

Elementary school
In 2006, Walton Rural Life Center in Walton, Kansas was the first public elementary school in the United States to base its curriculum around agriculture. Integrating agricultural components into the classroom is one of the challenges that elementary teachers face. They are also expected to teach with outdated teaching substances. John Block, who was a previous Secretary of Agriculture for the United States, encouraged agricultural competence. Agriculture in the Classroom was one of Block's achievements to stress agricultural literacy in 1981. Agriculture in the Classroom soon became utilized in each state. Though Agriculture in the Classroom was the beginning of agriculture education in all fifty states, elementary instruction began in some schools possibly before the 1900s. After elementary agriculture education began to grow, twenty-one states began to require it by 1915. The required curriculum was evenly split between urban and rural schools. The states that required agricultural education at the elementary level were all midwestern states or southern states; both of which are rich in agriculture.

High schools
Agricultural education at the high school level focuses on three main categories: classroom instruction, supervised agricultural experience (SAE), and active involvement in the National FFA Organization (Future Farmers of America).

Classroom instruction of an agricultural class teaches the students the basic concepts of the particular course through hands on learning and experience. Students will be taught the information in the curriculum in order for them to understand and develop skills in the application and problem solving issues that would occur in an agricultural setting.

The Supervised Agricultural Experience (SAE) portion of the agricultural curriculum is when a student must use the knowledge they have gained in the classroom instruction and use it in real life situations. Several topic choices are available for the student to choose between, whether it is on a farm setting, exploratory setting, entrepreneurship, agribusiness, or research projects. The student will choose a task from one of these topic areas and conduct a research experiment throughout the course of the agricultural class. The teacher is involved in the process and will help guide the student along the way. SAE programs give students the opportunity to take the information learned in the classroom setting and use it on an agricultural topic that interests them. This portion of an agricultural education will give students an idea of how it is working out in the real world and solving problems that will arise in the work field.

The FFA is a national organization that all agricultural classes at the high school level are involved in. The agricultural teacher is the leader of that particular schools FFA chapter, and will guide students’ activities and programs held throughout the year. FFA is an educational program designed to teach students leadership skills in both agricultural settings and everyday life, encourages personal growth in students, boosts self-confidence, builds character, encourage healthy lifestyles, and give students opportunities to be a part of the agricultural economy. FFA chapters will volunteer in communities, conduct banquets for FFA members and their families, raise awareness of agriculture, compete in FFA competitions, and attend national FFA conventions.

In some states, the agriculture teacher leads a local Young Farmers Association in monthly meetings. The group may comprise local farmers, citizens, and anyone interested in learning about agriculture and new farming methods. The Young Farmers Association is designed to aid the adoption of agricultural technologies, and it gives agriculture teachers the opportunity to meet local citizens and reach out to the community.

Colleges and universities

Land-grant universities awarded more than three-quarters of all agricultural degrees in 1988. These state schools receive federal aid under legislation that followed the Morrill Act of 1862, which granted public lands to support agricultural or mechanical education. Land-grant universities have three chief functions: teaching, research, and outreach, or extension.

Teaching 
A bachelor's degree in agricultural education generally leads to employment teaching agriculture up to the high school level or in the agricultural sector. Students are required to complete agriculture classes as well as education classes in order to become qualified to teach. A master's degree is required in order to teach at the college level. The Association for Career and Technical Education (ACTE), the largest national education association dedicated to the advancement of education that prepares youth and adults for careers, provides resources for agricultural education. An agricultural education degree also gives the qualifications to do extension work for universities and agricultural companies and organizations.

The following universities provide pathways to complete certification requirements of their home states in secondary agricultural education:
 Alcorn State University
 Angelo State University - Texas 
 Auburn University 
 Cornell University 
 Colorado State University, Degree Requirements
 Illinois State University, Degree Requirements
 Louisiana State University 
 Delaware Valley University
 Michigan State University, 
 Middle Tennessee State University
 Montana State University
 North Carolina State University 
 North Dakota State University 
 Oregon State University 
 The Pennsylvania State University, Degree Requirements
 South Dakota State University, Degree Requirements
 The University of Idaho 
 Sam Houston State University - Texas 
 Sul Ross State University - Texas 
 Texas A & M - Kingsville 
 Texas A & M - Commerce
 Texas A&M University
 Texas State University 
 Texas Tech University 
 Tarleton State University -Texas
 University of Arkansas
 University of Georgia
 University of Missouri, Degree Requirements
 Utah State University
 Washington State University
 West Virginia University
 West Texas A & M - Texas

Colleges of agriculture additionally prepare students for careers in all aspects of the food and agricultural system. Some career choices include food science, veterinary science, farming, ranching, teaching, marketing, agricultural communication, management, and social services. Colleges and universities awarded about 21,000 bachelor's degrees in agriculture per year in 1988, and about 6,000 master's or doctor's degrees.

Research 
Each land-grant university has an agricultural experiment station equipped with laboratories and experimental farms. There, agricultural scientists work to develop better farming methods, solve the special problems of local farmers, and provide new technology. Research published in scholarly journals about agricultural safety is available from the NIOSH-supported National Agricultural Safety Database. The American Dairy Science Association provides research and education scholarships focused on the dairy farm and processing industries.

Extension service
The Cooperative Extension System is a partnership of the federal, state, and county governments. This service distributes information gathered by the land-grant universities and the U.S. Department of Agriculture to farmers, families, and young people. County extension agents, located in most countries (1988), train and support about 3 million (1988) volunteer leaders. Agents and volunteers carry out extension programs through meetings, workshops, newsletters, radio, television, and visits.

Related Organizations
Professional organizations in the United States related to agricultural education include the American Association for Agricultural Education (AAAE), the Association for Career and Technical Education (ACTE), the National Association of Agricultural Educators (NAAE), and The National Council for Agricultural Education (The council).

4H Club is considered a youth development program that teaches children about sciences, leadership, research, etc. 4H club has over 6 million members nationwide and is the largest youth development organization in the United States. 4H members use hands on learning to reach goals and help in communities. Members of 4-H carry out group and individual projects dealing with conservation, food and agriculture, health and safety, and other subjects. The 4-H program in the United States is part of the Cooperative Extension service.

Somewhat similarly, the FFA is a national organization that teaches students leadership skills and is designed to help members become more well rounded citizens in the agricultural field. The FFA is an integral part of the program of agricultural education in many high schools as a result of Public Law 740 in 1950 (Currently revised as Public Law 105-225 of the 105th Congress of the United States), with 649,355 FFA members (2016-2017). Local chapters participate in Career Development Events (individually and as a team), each student has a Supervised Agricultural Experience program (SAE), and participates in many conferences and conventions to develop leadership, citizenship, patriotism and excellence in agriculture. The National FFA Organization is structured from the local chapter up, including local districts, areas, regions, state associations, and the national level. The FFA Mission is to make a positive difference in the lives of students by developing their potential for premier leadership, personal growth, and career success through agricultural education.

Outside the US

The history of agricultural education predates US activities and initially developed in Scottish, Italian and German colleges. The land grant approach of the USA owes much to the Scottish system in particular. Changes in higher agricultural education around the world today are highlighting implicit approaches that have hampered development and exceptional advances that have fed the world. the process has been described in one text (below) which takes a global perspective.

Agricultural education in other countries resembles that in the United States. Canada has its own 4-H program. Agriculture Canada distributes information on new farming methods and maintains experimental farms, research stations, and research institutions throughout the country. BC Agriculture in the Classroom Foundation operates in the province of British Columbia. In Australia, each state has several agricultural research stations and an extension service. Great Britain has a program of youth clubs called Young Farmer's Clubs that resemble 4-H. The Food and Agriculture Organization of the United Nations works to train people throughout the world in modern farming methods. The United States gives technical assistance to farmers in developing nations through its Agency for International Development (AID).

Australia 

As of February 2015 Agriculture in Australia employs over 235,300 people in the agriculture, fishing and forestry and fishing industry. This industry alone equates to 12% share of the GDP earning close to $155 billion a year. The farmers own a combined 135,997 farms covering approximately 61% of the land mass.

Given these figures the agricultural programs in place in school and universities in very important to the future of the county. Several high schools operate across the country specifying in agriculture education. Predominantly these high schools are set in the rural areas with access to land. On the majority of cases the students often travel 1000 km to attend schools, taking up residence at the schools as boarders for the school term. The one of the biggest in Australia is Farrer Memorial Agricultural High School in central New South Wales.
The Agriculture in Education programme launched by the Australian government in 2015 helps teachers better understand the products and processes associated with food and fibre production and gives students an opportunity to understand the importance of agriculture in the Australian economy. Topics covered by the materials include: designing and making a financial plan for a market garden, free range chicken farming, food security, and sustainable production practices in food and fibre.
The agricultural environment has changed enormously over the past 15 years, with greater emphasis on product quality issues, vertical integration from production to consumer, diversity in demand options, and environmental namely drought, welfare and ethical issues.

Western Australia 
In Western Australia, The Western Australian College of Agriculture is the primary provider of high schools in the state providing excellent educational opportunities at six campuses located near Cunderdin, Denmark, Esperance, Harvey, Morawa and Narrogin.
Each Campus has modern facilities on commercial sized farms and offers Year 10, 11 and 12 programs for male and female students. The students study a range of School Curriculum and Standards Authority subjects leading to Secondary Graduation and the Western Australian Certificate of Education and also complete vocational qualifications from Industry Training Packages. The major focus is on the study of agriculture but the program may also include horticulture, viticulture, equine, aquaculture, forestry, building construction, metals and engineering and automotive. Each Campus offers some specialist programs that can lead to tertiary study and apprenticeships and careers in a range of agriculture related vocations.
Tertiary studies located in Perth are available at Curtin University, Murdoch University and Muresk Institute offering degrees in Agriculture including Agricultural Business Management and Agricultural Science. 
Western Australian is in a precarious position and faces several challenges, fact that agriculture in Australia is affected by an ongoing shortage of labour and of skills. Labour supply is being adversely affected by an ageing workforce, retirements by baby boomers, seasonal nature of the lower skilled workforce and an inability to attract sufficient young people to work in the industry.

Agricultural educators 
 Otto Frederick Hunziker, Purdue University
 John Wrightson, Downton Agricultural College
 Raymond A. Pearson, Cornell University
 HAS University of Applied Sciences
 Kasetsart University
 King Mongkut's Institute of Technology Ladkrabang
 Wageningen University

See also 

 Agricultural engineering
 Agricultural extension
 Agricultural science
 Farmworld
 Holistic Management International
 Land economy
 List of agricultural universities and colleges
 Texas FFA Association

References

External links

 Holistic Management International
 Washington State University's Online Organic Agriculture Certificate Program
 AET Africa | Portal for Agricultural Education and Training in Africa  - Provides information on agricultural education in Africa
 PROTA  - Provides information on the approximately 7,000 useful plants of Tropical Africa and to provide wide access to the information through Webdatabases, Books, CD-Rom's and Special Products.
 Association of Career and Technical Education Agricultural Division
 Found Family Farm Learn by taking a tour at a small family farm!
 AgrowKnowledge - The National Center for Agriscience and Technology education
 Illinois Agricultural Education - Curriculum, Careers, and other resources for Ag Teachers in Illinois.
 National FFA Organization (Future Farmers of America)
 Transforming Agricultural Education for a Changing World. - 2009 report from the U.S. National Academy of Sciences
 Teach Agricultural Education Wiki - Learn more about teaching agricultural education grades 6-12
 Sustainable Agriculture Resources and Programs for K-12 Youth. from the United States Department of Agriculture, Sustainable Agriculture Research and Education (SARE) program.
 Educational and Training Opportunities in Sustainable Agriculture. 17th ed. 2006. A worldwide directory of academic and organizational programs from the Alternative Farming Systems Information Center, National Agricultural Library.
 "Should a Liberal Education Include an Agricultural Education?"—an article from the Chronicle of Higher Education.
 National Association of Agricultural Educators The professional organization for agricultural educators in the United States
 Hay Harvesting in the 1940s instructional films, Center for Digital Initiatives, University of Vermont Library